Josh Martin (born November 7, 1991) is an American football outside linebacker who is currently a free agent. He signed with the Kansas City Chiefs as an undrafted free agent in 2013, and has also been a member of the Tampa Bay Buccaneers, New York Jets and the New Orleans Saints.

Professional career

Kansas City Chiefs
In 2013 Martin was signed as an undrafted free agent. On September 24, 2013, he was waived. On September 26, 2013, he was signed to the Chiefs' practice squad. On November 30, 2013, he was elevated to the active roster. On April 6, 2015, he was re-signed. On September 7, 2015, he was waived. On September 8, 2015, he was placed on injured reserve. On September 9, 2015, he was waived from injured reserve.

Tampa Bay Buccaneers
On September 22, 2015, Martin was signed by the Tampa Bay Buccaneers. On October 7, 2015, he was waived. On October 8, 2015, he was placed on injured reserve. On October 14, 2015, he was waived from injured reserve.

Indianapolis Colts
On October 31, 2015, Martin was signed to the practice squad of the Indianapolis Colts.

New York Jets
On November 24, 2015, Martin was signed to the New York Jets' practice squad.

On March 9, 2017, Martin signed a two-year, $4.3 million contract extension with the Jets.

On October 1, 2018, Martin was placed on injured reserve after suffering a concussion in Week 4.

New Orleans Saints
On July 25, 2019, Martin was signed by the New Orleans Saints. He was placed on injured reserve on August 30, 2019.

References

External links
 Profile at Colts.com

1991 births
Living people
American football defensive ends
American football linebackers
Columbia Lions football players
Indianapolis Colts players
Kansas City Chiefs players
New Orleans Saints players
New York Jets players
Players of American football from Colorado
Sportspeople from Aurora, Colorado
Tampa Bay Buccaneers players